Rona Marjory Hurley (née Hamilton, 2 October 1897 – 11 June 1985) was a New Zealand  tobacco grower and buyer. Of Māori descent, she identified with the Ngati Porou and Te Whānau-ā-Apanui iwi. She was born in Gisborne, New Zealand, on 2 October 1897. She was the granddaughter of Thomas William Porter and Herewaka Porourangi Potai, and the niece of Fanny Rose Howie.

References

1897 births
1985 deaths
New Zealand farmers
New Zealand women farmers
Ngāti Porou people
Te Whānau-ā-Apanui people
New Zealand Māori farmers
People from Gisborne, New Zealand
People educated at Nelson College for Girls